Phyllophaga micans is a species in the family Scarabaeidae ("scarab beetles"), in the order Coleoptera ("beetles").
It is found in North America. Adults are 15–17mm long, dark colored with the appearance of a pale, dust-like coating, and feed on hardwood trees. It ranges from Connecticut and New York in the north, south to Georgia, and west to Kansas and Texas.

References

Further reading
 Arnett, R.H. Jr., M. C. Thomas, P. E. Skelley and J. H. Frank. (eds.). (2002). American Beetles, Volume II: Polyphaga: Scarabaeoidea through Curculionoidea. CRC Press LLC, Boca Raton, FL.
 Evans, Arthur V. (2003). "A checklist of the New World chafers (Coleoptera: Scarabaeidae: Melolonthinae)".
 Richard E. White. (1983). Peterson Field Guides: Beetles. Houghton Mifflin Company.
 Ross H. Arnett. (2000). American Insects: A Handbook of the Insects of America North of Mexico. CRC Press.

External links
NCBI Taxonomy Browser, Phyllophaga micans

Melolonthinae